"Beats of Love" is a song by Belgian band Nacht und Nebel, released in 1983.

Song information
The song was written by the band's founder, Patrick Marina Nebel. Chris Whitley contributed guitar part to the song.

The single was initially released in Belgium in 1983, before becoming a Top 3 hit there in spring 1984. It was then released in other European countries and eventually sold in 150.000 copies in Belgium and France alone.

Track listing

7" Single (Belgium, 1983)
A. "Beats of Love" – 4:00
B. "Walk On" – 5:35

12" Single (Belgium, 1983)
A. "Beats of Love" – 5:37
B. "Everything Is White" – 3:54

7" Single (Spain, 1985)
A. "Beats of Love" – 3:25
B. "Europe Cries" – 3:45

12" Single (Canada, 1985)
A. "Beats of Love" (Special Remix) – 5:55
B. "Victoria 2000" – 6:00

Chart performance

Weekly charts

Year-end charts

Cover versions
 British band Bollock Brothers recorded a cover version of the song for their 1989 album Mythology.
 In 1995, the song was covered by Belgian rock group The Clement Peerens Explosition on their album Foorwijf!. A version featuring Sarah Bettens was also recorded.
 Belgian boyband quartet Get Ready! recorded a cover of "Beats of Love" in 2002 with guest vocals from French singer Amanda Lear. The single, released by Virgin Records, reached no. 48 in Belgium. It was included on the band's 2002 album Incognito as well as Lear's 2003 Tendance.
 An electronic cover by Villa featuring The New Sins was released in 2010 and reached no. 38 in Belgian singles chart.

References

1983 singles
1983 songs
2002 singles
2010 singles
Amanda Lear songs
Belgian new wave songs
Belgian pop songs
Belgian electronic songs
English-language Belgian songs
Disques Vogue singles
Roadrunner Records singles
Virgin Records singles